Chelow can refer to: 
 Kebab 
 Pilaf
 Chelow, Iran (disambiguation)